Jenna McParland (born May 12, 1992) is a Canadian ice hockey forward, currently playing for the Toronto Six in the National Women's Hockey League (NWHL).

Playing career   
Across 141 NCAA Division I games with the Minnesota Duluth Bulldogs, McParland scored 116 points. 

She was drafted 6th overall by the Brampton Thunder in the 2015 CWHL Draft. After graduating, she signed with Brampton in the Canadian Women's Hockey League (CWHL). She would play the next four seasons with the club, until the collapse of the CWHL in 2019. In 2018, she won the Clarkson Cup with the team.

In May 2019, she joined the Professional Women's Hockey Players Association (PWHPA), and would spend the 2019–20 season with the organisation. In 2020, she signed with the expansion Toronto Six of the NWHL, but chose to opt-out of the 2020-21 COVID-19 bubble season.

International play 

She played for Team Canada at the 2010 IIHF World Women's U18 Championship, scoring 7 points in 5 games as the country won gold.

Personal life 

She attended Robert F. Hall Catholic Secondary School in Caledon, Ontario. Her brother, Nick McParland, played three years in the ECHL.

Career statistics

References

External links
 

 
1992 births
Living people
People from Thunder Bay District
Ice hockey people from Ontario
Minnesota Duluth Bulldogs women's ice hockey players
Markham Thunder players
Professional Women's Hockey Players Association players
Toronto Six players